Philip H. Rosenfelt is an American lawyer and civil servant who served as the acting United States Secretary of Education from January 20, 2021 to March 2, 2021. He served in this same position under the Trump administration prior to the Senate confirming Betsy DeVos.

On November 23, 2016, President-elect Donald Trump announced Betsy DeVos to be his designee for Secretary of Education. Prior to DeVos' confirmation by the United States Senate, Rosenfelt was the acting Secretary of Education. Rosenfelt served from January 20, 2017 to February 7, 2017, when DeVos was sworn in.

With the departure of Betsy DeVos at the end of former president Donald Trump's term, Rosenfelt once again assumed the position of acting secretary; this time under the administration of President Joe Biden. Rosenfelt was serving in an acting capacity under Joe Biden's administration until the Senate reviewed the nomination of Miguel Cardona for the position.

Personal life
Born in Paterson, New Jersey, Rosenfelt is of Jewish descent. He received a bachelor of science degree from the University of Pennsylvania, his juris doctor from Columbia University, and his LLM from New York University. He began his service in the federal government in 1971 at the Department of Health, Education, and Welfare.

Career
In 2005, Rosenfelt assumed the position of Deputy General Counsel of the United States Department of Education for Program Service. He served under the administration of George W. Bush. He has continued to serve in that capacity since his appointment.

From January 20, 2017 to April 23, 2018, Rosenfelt served as the General Counsel of the United States Department of Education.

He has been designated as the acting United States Secretary of Education on two occasions; the first of these from January 20, 2017 to February 7, 2017, and the second from January 20, 2021 until March 2, 2021. He has been replaced by President Biden's nominee Miguel Cardona as he was confirmed by the Senate.

References

External links
 

Living people
Columbia Law School alumni
New York University School of Law alumni
People from Paterson, New Jersey
Trump administration cabinet members
Biden administration cabinet members
United States Department of Education officials
United States Secretaries of Education
University of Pennsylvania alumni
New York (state) Independents
Lawyers from New York City
Year of birth missing (living people)